Barn Church may refer to:

 Barn church, architecturally type of church

United Kingdom

England
The Barn Church, Kew, London
 Barn Chapel, Great Totham, Maldon, Essex

 The Barn, home of Bidford Baptist Church in Bidford-on-Avon, Warwickshire
 St Alban's, Cheam or Church of St Alban the Martyr, Cheam, London
 St Michael's Barn Church, Farley Green, Surrey

Scotland
 Barn Church, Culloden, Scotland

United States
 The Barn Church, Dunlap, California
 Barn Church (Troy, Michigan)
 Old Barn Church; see Old Whaler's Church (Sag Harbor), New York